Like I Do may refer to:

"Like I Do" (Christina Aguilera song), 2018
"Like I Do" (David Guetta, Martin Garrix and Brooks song), 2018
"Like I Do" (For Real song), 1996
"Like I Do" (Nancy Sinatra song), 1962; covered by Maureen Evans, 1962
"(Ain't Nobody Loves You) Like I Do", a song by La Toya Jackson, 1987
"Like I Do", a song by Minipop from the 2007 album A New Hope